Avatha subumbra is a species of moth of the family Erebidae. It is found on New Guinea and Australia, where it has been recorded from Queensland.

References

Moths described in 1906
Avatha
Moths of New Guinea
Moths of Australia